Gordon Lee Atkins (born 5 March 1937) is a Canadian retired architect. During a career lasting from 1960 to 1999, he practiced primarily in Calgary, although he designed several projects elsewhere in western Canada. Along with contemporaries including Peter Hemingway, Jack Long, and Douglas Cardinal, Atkins is credited with developing a distinct Canadian prairie style of architecture. In 1967 Atkins became the first Albertan to receive the Massey Medal for Architecture.

Biography

Atkins was born Gordon Lee Kearl on 5 March 1937 in Calgary, Alberta. Shortly after his birth his parents divorced and he moved to Cardston with his mother, living with her and his grandparents. Later he changed his last name to his mother's.

After a suggestion by his high school principal, Atkins decided to study architecture in university. Choosing to attend the University of Washington, he studied there from 1955 to 1960. Upon graduation Atkins took a job in Winnipeg with the firm Green Blankstein and Russell. After working a year in Winnipeg, in 1961 Atkins moved to Calgary where he joined the partnership Alton McCaul Bowers. In 1963 he opened his own practice under his own name. For his Melchin Summer Homes, in 1967 he became the first Albertan architect to win the Massey Medal for Architecture. In 1977 he formed a partnership with Robert E. Weston called Gordon Atkins and Associates Architects.

Atkins lived in a home at 1008 Durham Avenue South West in the Mount Royal neighbourhood in Calgary. He used the house to experiment ideas on, significantly modifying it during his residence. The house was demolished circa 2011. A Mormon, he has twice served as a bishop in the Church of Jesus Christ of Latter-day Saints.

Atkins's records are held at the Canadian Architectural Archives in Calgary as the Gordon Atkins fonds.

Works

References

"Gordon Lee Atkins." In The Canadian Encyclopedia. Retrieved from http://www.thecanadianencyclopedia.ca/en/article/gordon-lee-atkins/.
Guimond, Pierre S.; Sinclair, Brian R. Calgary Architecture: The Boom Years, 1972-1982. Detselig Enterprises, 1984.
Livesey, Graham. Gordon Atkins: Architecture 1960-95. Calgary: University of Calgary Press, 2005.

University of Washington College of Built Environments alumni
Canadian architects
1937 births
People from Calgary
Canadian leaders of the Church of Jesus Christ of Latter-day Saints
Living people